Walter Ford may refer to:
 Walter Burton Ford, American mathematician and philanthropist
 Walter Ford (baseball), American baseball pitcher

See also
 Walter Forde, British actor, screenwriter and director